Mount Pleasant Township is a township in Cass County, in the U.S. state of Missouri.

Mount Pleasant Township takes its name from its location on a hill.

References

Townships in Missouri
Townships in Cass County, Missouri